The Lewellen House, at 2nd and Chestnut Streets in Magdalena, New Mexico, was listed on the National Register of Historic Places in 1982.

It is a one-and-a-half-story wood-frame house with stucco exterior, with a complex hipped roof.  It has a projecting front gable with a veranda on two sides, with modified Doric columns.  Other Classical Revival elements include returned eaves and pediments on the house's dormers.

References

External links

National Register of Historic Places in Socorro County, New Mexico